K-group or K group may refer to:

 A group in algebraic K-theory
 A group in topological K-theory
 A complemented group
 K-gruppen (K-groups), small Communist groups in 1970s Germany